William Frederick Dunnill (1880–1936) was an English cathedral organist, who served in St. Philip's Cathedral, Birmingham.

Background

He was born in Wakefield, Yorkshire on 16 March 1880. He was the son of Jeremiah Dunnill (Music Seller and Music Teacher) and Pollie. In 1891 they were living at 1 Cheapside, Wakefield

He was a pupil of Joseph Naylor Hardy at Wakefield Cathedral.

He died in the vestry of St. Philip's Cathedral, Birmingham on 28 September 1936.

Career

Assistant organist of Wakefield Cathedral 1896 - 1900

Organist of:
Christ Church, Surbiton 1900 - 1901
St. Luke's Church, Bromley 1901 - 1903
St. Mary's Church, Nottingham 1903 - 1914
St. Philip's Cathedral, Birmingham 1914 - 1936

References

English classical organists
British male organists
Cathedral organists
1880 births
1936 deaths
People from Wakefield
20th-century organists
20th-century British male musicians
20th-century classical musicians
Male classical organists